Triviella aperta, commonly named the baby's toes, is a species of small sea snail, a marine gastropod mollusk in the family Triviidae, the false cowries or trivias.

Description

Distribution
This species occurs off the south coast of South Africa.

References

 Kilburn, R.N. (1974) Taxonomic notes on South African marine Mollusca (3): Gastropoda: Prosobranchia, with descriptions of new taxa of Naticidae, Fasciolariidae, Magilidae, Volutomitridae and Turridae. Annals of the Natal Museum, 22, 187–220. 
 Cate C.N. (1979) A review of the Triviidae (Mollusca: Gastropoda). San Diego Society of Natural History, Memoir 10: 1-126. page(s): 18
 Kilburn, R.N. & Rippey, E. (1982) Sea Shells of Southern Africa. Macmillan South Africa, Johannesburg, xi + 249 pp. page(s): 59
 Steyn, D.G. & Lussi, M. (1998) Marine Shells of South Africa. An Illustrated Collector’s Guide to Beached Shells. Ekogilde Publishers, Hartebeespoort, South Africa, ii + 264 pp. page(s): 52
 Liltved W.R. (2000) Cowries and their relatives of southern Africa. A study of the southern African cypraeacean and velutinacean gastropod fauna. Seacomber Publications. 224 pp. page(s): 174
 Fehse D. (2002) Beiträge zur Kenntnis der Triviidae (Mollusca: Gastropoda) V. Kritische Beurteilung der Genera und Beschreibung einer neuen Art der Gattung Semitrivia Cossmann, 1903. Acta Conchyliorum 6: 3-48. page(s): 22

External links
 Branch, G.M. et al. (2002). Two Oceans. 5th impression. David Philip, Cate Town & Johannesburg

Endemic fauna of South Africa
Triviidae
Gastropods described in 1822